Orrell Park is a district of Liverpool, Merseyside, England. It is a small residential area of northern Liverpool between the larger neighbouring districts of Aintree and Walton-on-the-Hill. It is part of the Liverpool Walton Parliamentary constituency. The area is built upon a raised hillock.

History

The area is predominantly Victorian in character and architecture, being built mainly for workers and managers of the Bootle docks during rapid expansion from 1850 onwards with the Industrial Revolution and growth of maritime trade from the British Empire. There is also some Edwardian housing as well as pockets of post-war housing built after the area suffered bomb damage during World War II. Prior to industrialisation, the area - part of the Earl of Sefton's estate - was mainly pasture land and orchards.

A number of roads in the area are named after historical British figures at the time they were built such as Victoria Drive (Queen Victoria), Albert Drive (Prince Albert), Alexandra Drive (Queen Alexandra), Kitchener Drive (The Earl Kitchener), Montgomery Road (Viscount Montgomery of Alamein) and Redvers Drive (General Sir Redvers Buller).

Transport and local amenities

The area's main link to Liverpool City Centre is Orrell Park railway station, part of the Merseyrail metro system. A number of bus routes run directly to the city centre from nearby Walton Vale which is around a 10-minute walk from the Orrell Park area.

A popular nightclub and concert venue, The Orrell Park Bar (formerly a ballroom built in 1927 and still known locally as the "OPB"), is located in the district. Rory Storm and the Hurricanes, Ringo Starr, and Jerry Lee Lewis have performed there. Orrell Park is also home to Devonfield Gardens, a Green Flag Award winner, and the smallest of such in England, which regularly hosts community events.

Orrell Park Community Centre is over 40 years old, and has a wide range of activities, classes and free events. It is situated opposite Orrell Park train station and has its own car park for visitors.

The Orrell Park Hotel is a 12 bedroomed family run hotel, based on the outskirts of Orrell Park. The hotel was previously two large Edwardian residential houses which were converted into a hotel in 1971. The Hotel was re-opened in 2013 following refurbishment.

Other local amenities include The Warbreck Pub, The Cuckoo Pub, The Windsor Pub and the Carlton Bingo Social Club. There is also a local ASDA supermarket located on Orrell Lane with a variety of small local shops located along both Orrell Lane and Moss Lane which are the two central thoroughfares of the area.

References

External links

Liverpool Street Gallery - Liverpool 9

Areas of Liverpool